Bernadette Cynthia Szőcs (born 5 March 1995) is a Romanian professional table tennis player.

Career
In September 2011, she travelled to Argentina for the World Junior Circuit event where she overtook Kasumi Ishikawa to reach the top spot in the competition series.

In July 2012, she was ranked 5th in the ITTF World Junior Circuit.

Szocs won the singles event in the inaugural season of T2, beating Feng Tianwei in the final.

Szocs played for Dabangg Delhi TTC in Ultimate table tennis, a table tennis league in India.

In August 2019 she was ranked no. 14 in the world in the International Table Tennis Federation rankings and no. 1 in the European Table Tennis Union rankings, and in July in the T2 Diamond event, became the first player to use a coloured rubber – pink.

In Szőcs's first international match in 2021, Szocs upset second seed and world ranked number 8 Cheng I-Ching in the round of 32 of the WTT Contender event at WTT Doha.

Personal life
Szőcs is of Hungarian descent. She has an older brother, Hunor, who is also a table tennis player.

References

External links
 
 
 
 
 

Romanian female table tennis players
Living people
1995 births
Sportspeople from Târgu Mureș
Romanian sportspeople of Hungarian descent
Table tennis players at the 2010 Summer Youth Olympics
Table tennis players at the 2015 European Games
Table tennis players at the 2019 European Games
European Games medalists in table tennis
European Games silver medalists for Romania
Table tennis players at the 2016 Summer Olympics
Olympic table tennis players of Romania
Universiade medalists in table tennis
Universiade bronze medalists for Romania
Medalists at the 2015 Summer Universiade
Medalists at the 2017 Summer Universiade
Table tennis players at the 2020 Summer Olympics
Romanian people of Hungarian descent